Assumption High School (AHS) is a Roman Catholic high school in the Roman Catholic Diocese of Davenport in the U.S. state of Iowa. Bridget Murphy is the current principal of Assumption High.

In 1958, AHS opened its doors as a co-institutional facility, with the merger of St. Ambrose Academy and Immaculate Conception Academy. AHS became coeducational in 1969.

Academics 
AHS offers AP classes and dual-enrollment college courses on campus. The majority of the school's upperclassmen take the ACT, and their scores consistently rank above the Iowa and national averages.

Most Assumption students come from Catholic feeder schools, such as St. Paul the Apostle (Panthers), John F. Kennedy (Crusaders), Lourdes (Lancers), & All Saints (Saints).

Faculty and staff 
AHS's faculty is made up of mostly lay teachers with priests and nuns teaching several religion courses. Many hold master's degrees in education or content areas, and all meet the criteria for the Iowa teaching standards.

Student life and activities 
AHS provides activities beyond the classroom. More than two-thirds of the student body participates in at least one sport, and many people join clubs as well.

Athletics
Davenport Assumption participates in the Mississippi Athletic Conference, and athletic teams are known as the Knights. School colors are red and white. The school fields athletic teams in 17 sports, including:

 Summer: Baseball, softball.
 Fall: Football, volleyball, boys' cross country, girls' cross country and boys' golf.
 Winter: Boys' basketball, girls' basketball and wrestling.
 Spring: Boys' track and field, girls' track and field, boys' soccer, girls' soccer, girls' golf, boys' tennis and girls' tennis.

Davenport Assumption is classified as a 3A school (Iowa's second-largest tier of high schools), according to the Iowa High School Athletic Association and Iowa Girls' High School Athletic Union; in sports where there are fewer divisions, the Knights are in either the lowest or middle class, depending on the sport (e.g., Class 2A for wrestling and boys' soccer; Class 1A for tennis and girls' soccer). However, Assumption competes in the largest class (Class 4A) for boys' golf. The school is a member of the 10-team Mississippi Athletic Conference (known to locals as the MAC), which comprises schools from the Iowa Quad Cities (Bettendorf, Davenport Central, Davenport North, Davenport West, North Scott, Pleasant Valley), along with Burlington, Clinton and Muscatine high schools.

Successes
Throughout the school's history, Davenport Assumption has enjoyed great success in many of its sports, earning many MAC conference titles and producing all-state athletes who have enjoyed success at the collegiate level and in their careers. Assumption has won numerous state titles in wrestling, baseball, softball, girls' soccer, girls' track and field, and girls' basketball.

 Baseball (12-time State Champions - 1953, 1982, 1992, 1993, 1995, 1999, 2004, 2006, 2008, 2014, 2017, 2018) 
 Boys' Basketball (3-time Class 3A State Champions - 1982, 1999, 2000)
 Girls' Basketball (4-time State Champions - 2008, 2011, 2012, 2013)
 Boys' Cross Country - 1974 Class AA State Champions
 Girls' Cross Country - 2015 Class 3A State Champions
 Boys' Golf - 1954 State Champions
 Boys' Soccer (2-time Class 1A State Champions - 2002 2003)
 Girls' Soccer (10-time Class 1A State Champions - 2002, 2003, 2011, 2012, 2013, 2014, 2016, 2017, 2018, 2019)
 Softball (3-time Class 3A State Champions - 2017, 2018, 2019)
 Boys' Tennis - 2012 Class 1A State Champions
 Girls' Track and Field (5-time Class 3A State Champions - 2013, 2014, 2015, 2016, 2017)
 Wrestling (5-time Class 2A State Champions - 1995, 1998, 1999, 2011, 2014) 
 Wrestling (9-time Class 2A State Duals Champions - 1995, 1996, 1998, 1999, 2011, 2012, 2013, 2014, 2016)

See also
List of high schools in Iowa

References

External links
Assumption High School
Unofficial Assumption High School Athletics Site

Catholic secondary schools in Iowa
Educational institutions established in 1958
Roman Catholic Diocese of Davenport
Schools in Davenport, Iowa
1958 establishments in Iowa